The Department of Environment and Local Government is a part of the Government of New Brunswick. It is charged with maintaining relationships with New Brunswick's municipalities, administering its unincorporated Local Service Districts and the administration of its environmental policy, including the Province's Environmental Impact Assessment Regulation.

The department was established on March 23, 2000 when Premier Bernard Lord restructured the New Brunswick Cabinet. It was a merger of the former Department of Environment and part of the former Department of Municipalities and Housing. On February 14, 2006 it was split into the Department of Environment and the Department of Local Government. On March 15, 2012 it was re-established when the departments of Environment and Local Government were merged under the incumbent Minister of Local Government Bruce Fitch.

Ministers 

* Holder continued as minister in the new Department of Environment.
** Fitch had been serving as minister of local government.

References

External links 
 Department of Environment and Local Government

Environment and Local Government
New Brunswick